Joseph R. Guerrido (born April 10, 1986), better known by his stage name Produkt, is a Puerto Rican rapper and songwriter, born in Bronx, New York. He founded his label, Legacy Records Inc., in 2006. Since then, he has released two free mixtapes. He is the first rapper ever to be nominated for more than 3 single-year Underground Music Awards in the UMA's 11-year history.

Career
Produkt is the first rapper to be nominated for 10 single-year Underground Music Awards. In 2014, he set a single-year record by winning three Underground Music Awards, the most in the UMA's 11-year history. Produkt's two-year-long ascent to notoriety accelerated when he released two well received singles: "Hold it Down" and "Freak Affair" in 2014. After thousands of downloads and shares on social media sites, "Hold it Down" caught the attention of music critics and in 2014 was nominated as UMA's Video and Song of the Year. Produkt's "Hold It Down" reached No. 9 on Billboard Hot Single Sales.

In 2015 Produkt set another major record by becoming the fastest artist to break into the LiveMixtapes top 50 most streamed Indy mixtapes with over 308,000 streams, passing current great artists' debut project like Kendrick Lamar, Shoolboy Q, Logic, Kevin Gates, and many other prominent names in hip hop.

Once just another dealer chasing the good life, Produkt shifted focus solely to his music, writing, and rapping skills following the birth of his daughter. The Hispanic rapper counts Big Pun as his primary influence. Hip hop critics have been quoted as saying: "One listen to his music and it's plain to see that he is a force to be reckoned with," (Yo! Raps)  and Hip Hop Lead says: "Produkt is the embodiment of true hip hop".

Following up his 2015 release "In.con.spic.ous" Produkt released "Change The Frequency". The Bronx native held a private listening event sponsored by Respect Magazine on July 26 in the Chelsea section of Manhattan where celebrities and influencers like Tahiry of Love & Hip-Hop came out to support his latest release. The event was hosted by Torae of Sirius XM's Hip-Hop Nation and DJ Envy of The Breakfast Club. It was a huge night for Produkt who shared the emotional experiences that led to the creativity of this project with his guest. From a tumor scare, to his battle with the streets and grind as a rapper, Produkt broke down the meaning of his music and purpose bar for bar.

Mixtapes 
{| class="wikitable sortable plainrowheaders" style="text-align:center;"
|+ List of mixtapes, with year released
! scope="col" style="width:11em;" | Title
! scope="col" style="width:16em;" | Album details
|-
!scope="row"|'From Flesh To Stone|
 Released: July 6, 2011

 Format: Digital download
|-
!scope="row"|Mantra of a Dealer|
 Released: December 5, 2013

 Format: Digital download
|-
!scope="row"|In.con.spic.u.ous|
 Released: June 16, 2015

 Format: Digital download|
|-
!Change The Frequency!
 Released: August 8, 2017
 Label: Legacy Records
 Format: Digital download
|}

 Singles 

Music videos

 Awards 

 Underground Music Awards 

2014 Won#1 Contender AwardBest Male Rapper of the YearThe UMA Song of the Year''– ("Hold It Down")

All-Star Music Awards

2014 Won
Video of the Year("Puerto Ricans F#%king Up The V.I.P.")
Artist of the Year

References

External links
 

1984 births
Living people
American male rappers
Musicians from New York City
Rappers from the Bronx
21st-century American rappers
21st-century American male musicians